Niumalu Beach Park is a county beach park in the district of Niumalu on the south-east coast of the island of Kauai in the Hawaiian Islands.
The Hulēʻia National Wildlife Refuge is adjacent to the west, and Nāwiliwili Beach Park and harbor are adjacent to the east. Through much of the 19th century, it was home of Paul Kanoa, his son Paul P. Kanoa (both were Royal Governor of Kauai), and family.
The hill above the beach later became county offices and then Kauai High School. For a while mangrove trees were taking over the beach. The Boy Scouts were part of the clean-up crew who volunteered to renovate the beach in 2014.

References

Beaches of Kauai
Protected areas of Kauai
Parks in Hawaii